Jorge Jesús Rodríguez Gómez (born 9 November 1965) is a Venezuelan politician and psychiatrist serving as President of the National Assembly of Venezuela since 2021. He previously served as the vice president of Venezuela from 2007 to 2008 and as Mayor of the Libertador Bolivarian Municipality from 2009 to 2017. He is the brother of Delcy Rodríguez, the current vice president.

Rodríguez was elected as president of the National Assembly of Venezuela, after being nominated by the Great Patriotic Pole on 5 January 2021. Rodríguez will direct the first year of the 5th Legislature of the National Assembly, which resulted from elections held on 6 December 2020.

Career
He was born in Barquisimeto. Prior to his appointment as vice-president, Rodríguez had been the chief of Venezuela's National Electoral Council.

On 3 January 2007 President Hugo Chávez announced that Rodríguez would be the next vice president, replacing José Vicente Rangel. He was sworn in on 8 January, two days before Chávez's swearing in for his next term as president.

Rodríguez studied medicine at the Central University of Venezuela (UCV); he was the president of the Federation of University Centers in 1988. After graduating, he studied psychiatry at the UCV and community clinical psychology at the Andrés Bello Catholic University.

He headed the government's campaign in favor of a group of constitutional amendments in the December 2007 referendum. Following the defeat of the referendum, Chávez announced on 3 January 2008 that he was replacing Rodríguez with Ramón Carrizales, previously the Minister of Housing.  Chávez said that Rodríguez would concentrate on developing the new United Socialist Party of Venezuela.

In the November 2008 regional elections, Rodríguez was elected as Mayor of the Libertador District in Caracas.

Sanctions 
Rodríguez has been sanctioned by several countries and is banned from entering neighboring Colombia.

Canada 
On 22 September 2017, Canada sanctioned Rodríguez due to rupture of Venezuela's constitutional order following the 2017 Venezuelan Constituent Assembly election.

Colombia 
In January 2019, Rodríguez was banned by Colombia from entering the country, included in an entry ban list of over 200 people with a "close relationship and support for the Nicolás Maduro regime."

United States 
The United States sanctioned Rodriguez on 25 September 2018 for his efforts in solidifying President Maduro's power in Venezuela.

Personal life 
His father, was a leader in the Socialist League of Venezuela. His sister, Delcy Rodríguez, has also served as a senior official during the Maduro administration. 

During the pandemic in Venezuela, Rodríguez tested positive for COVID-19 on 13 August 2020.

References

External links
Jorge Rodríguez Gómez (Vicepresidencia de la República)

1965 births
Living people
People from Barquisimeto
Fifth Republic Movement politicians
United Socialist Party of Venezuela politicians
Vice presidents of Venezuela
Electoral branch of the Government of Venezuela
Mayors of places in Venezuela
Central University of Venezuela alumni
Andrés Bello Catholic University alumni
People of the Crisis in Venezuela